Alexei Yegorov (born October 22, 1976) is a Russian former professional ice hockey goaltender who last played for Vityaz Chekhov of the Kontinental Hockey League (KHL).

External links

1976 births
Living people
HC Vityaz players
Russian ice hockey goaltenders
HC CSKA Moscow players
HC Dynamo Moscow players
Krylya Sovetov Moscow players
SKA Saint Petersburg players
Atlant Moscow Oblast players

References